Anthony Daniels (born 21 February 1946) is an English actor and mime artist, best known for playing  in 10 Star Wars films. He is the only actor to have either appeared in or been involved with all theatrical films in the series, and has been involved in many of their spin-offs, including television series, video games, and radio serials.

Daniels was the voice of Legolas in the Ralph Bakshi animated adaptation of The Lord of the Rings (1978). He has appeared intermittently on British television in various dramas, including playing a pathologist in Prime Suspect starring Helen Mirren. Daniels is currently an adjunct professor at Carnegie Mellon University's Entertainment Technology Center.

Early life
Daniels was born in Salisbury, Wiltshire, England, the son of a plastics company executive. He was educated at Giggleswick School and studied law for two years at university, then dropped out to participate in amateur dramatics and attend Rose Bruford College. After leaving the college in 1974, Daniels worked on BBC Radio and for the National Theatre of Great Britain at The Young Vic. Whilst working in the theatre, he was invited to meet director George Lucas, who was casting for Star Wars. Daniels at first turned down the interview but was persuaded by his agent to meet Lucas.

Daniels has said that before his role in Star Wars, the only science fiction film he had ever seen in a theatre was 2001: A Space Odyssey in 1968; he was so displeased with the film that he walked out after 10 minutes and demanded his money back. In a 2011 interview, Daniels said that he now regards 2001 as a masterpiece and that he also enjoys post-apocalyptic films such as Mad Max.

He was a member of the BBC's Radio Drama Company, and speaks fluent French.

Career

Star Wars

After auditioning for the role of C-3PO, Daniels only became fully interested in it after seeing a concept design of the golden droid C-3PO by Ralph McQuarrie. Daniels did not see the final costume until after donning it for the shoot and being shown a Polaroid photograph. He struggled with delivering the character's lines until Lucas informed him that they would redub the dialogue in post-production. Daniels also portrayed a protocol droid with a "white pointy face" in one shot in the original film. Daniels was depressed with his lack of recognition after the film's successful release; he attributes this to Lucasfilm wanting audiences to believe that the droids were real.

Daniels has played C-3PO in all of the Star Wars feature films (with the exception of Solo: A Star Wars Story) from the original instalment in the series as the golden droid's body and voice. Kenny Baker, who played R2-D2 in the series until his death in 2016, said that he and Daniels did not get along.
Daniels has reprised the role for various promotional work such as hosting The Making of Star Wars, Star Wars Connections and Science of Star Wars, appearances on The Muppet Show, Sesame Street, an anti-smoking public service announcement, The Star Wars Holiday Special, and advertising for Star Wars-licensed products such as Kenner toys and a breakfast cereal based on the character.

Daniels voiced C-3PO in the Star Wars radio serial based on the original trilogy. He is the only cast member of the original Star Wars trilogy to voice his character in all three parts of NPR's dramatisations of the trilogy. He voiced C-3PO for six animated series: Droids, Clone Wars, The Clone Wars, Rebels, Forces of Destiny, and Resistance. Other C-3PO voicework by Daniels includes: the Christmas-themed Christmas in the Stars album, Disney theme park attractions including Star Tours and Star Tours: The Adventures Continue, and the Star Tours shutdown ceremony as a part of Disney's Hollywood Studios' "Last Tour to Endor" event at Star Wars Celebration V in Orlando, Florida. He also provided the narration and all character voices for the audio books Dark Force Rising and The Last Command.

Daniels contributed the foreword to the collected scripts of the Return of the Jedi radio drama, as their author Brian Daley died while they were being recorded.

In Episode I: The Phantom Menace, Daniels only voiced the character, which a puppeteer played on set. Daniels attempted to puppeteer the character himself in the sequel, Episode II: Attack of the Clones, but after the script was changed, he returned to playing the droid in costume. In this film and 2005's Episode III: Revenge of the Sith, he also performed the vocal tracks for scenes that featured a computer-generated C-3PO. Daniels is the only actor to act in all nine films, the 2008 Clone Wars film, and the related television series.

Daniels also makes cameo appearances as a humanoid in two scenes of the feature films. His character, Lieutenant Dannl Faytonni, is named as a tribute to his own name, albeit in modified form. The character appears in the nightclub scene early in Attack of the Clones as a man in blue uniform who can be seen in a cutaway reaction shot after Obi-Wan Kenobi disarms the bounty hunter Zam Wesell. Faytonni can also be seen at the Galaxies Opera House in Revenge of the Sith.

Daniels reprised his role as C-3PO in the seventh Star Wars film, The Force Awakens, which was released in December 2015. J. J. Abrams, the director of The Force Awakens, told Daniels that he was only going to be the voice of C-3PO in the film, but changed his mind and decided Daniels would wear the suit in the film as well. Abrams made a new C-3PO suit for Daniels to wear during filming using 3D printing that allowed Daniels a great deal more mobility and comfort than the original suit. Daniels has stated his displeasure with the droid's red arm. Daniels also appeared as C-3PO in 2017's The Last Jedi, and 2019's The Rise of Skywalker.

Daniels appears in a cameo as C-3PO in 2016's Rogue One, the first standalone film in the Star Wars anthology series. He also makes an appearance as Tak in the second anthology film, Solo: A Star Wars Story,
and voiced C-3PO's cameo appearance in Ralph Breaks the Internet, and The Lego Movie alongside other crewmembers of the Millennium Falcon.
He has also hosted the Star Wars: In Concert tour in North America.

In March 2017, All Nippon Airways introduced a Boeing 777 modelled after C-3PO into service. Daniels attended the aircraft's unveiling.

Other acting roles
Daniels was the voice of Legolas in the Ralph Bakshi animated adaptation of The Lord of the Rings (1978). He has appeared intermittently on British television in various dramas, notably in a recurring role in Prime Suspect starring Helen Mirren. He also played the priest in the British spoof horror film I Bought a Vampire Motorcycle (1990).

Other work
Daniels is an adjunct professor at Carnegie Mellon University's Entertainment Technology Center.

His autobiography, I Am C-3PO: The Inside Story, was released on 5 November 2019 by DK. He had previously considered using the title Telling the Odds.

Filmography

Film

Television

Documentary

Theme park attractions

Video games

References 
Footnotes

Citations

Sources

External links 

 
 
 
 
 Anthony Daniels at BFI
 Multimedia Q&A with Daniels from the BBC website for the Ghosts of Albion

1946 births
Living people
20th-century English male actors
21st-century English male actors
English male film actors
English male television actors
English male voice actors
British mimes
Audiobook narrators
Carnegie Mellon University faculty
People educated at Giggleswick School
Alumni of Rose Bruford College
People from Salisbury
Male actors from Wiltshire